Hercules is a 1997 American animated musical fantasy comedy film produced by Walt Disney Feature Animation for Walt Disney Pictures. The 35th Disney animated feature film and the eighth animated film produced during the Disney Renaissance, it is loosely based on the legendary hero Heracles (known in the film by his Roman name, Hercules), the son of Zeus, in Greek mythology. The film was directed by John Musker and Ron Clements, both of whom also produced the film with Alice Dewey Goldstone. The screenplay was written by Musker, Clements, Donald McEnery, Bob Shaw, and Irene Mecchi. Featuring the voices of Tate Donovan, Danny DeVito, James Woods, and Susan Egan, the film follows the titular Hercules, a demigod with super-strength raised among mortals, who must learn to become a true hero in order to earn back his godhood and place in Mount Olympus, while his evil uncle Hades plots his downfall.

Development of Hercules began in 1992 following a pitch adaptation of the Heracles mythological stories by animator Joe Haidar. Meanwhile, Clements and Musker re-developed their idea for Treasure Planet (2002) following the critical and commercial success of Aladdin (1992). Their project was removed from development in 1993, and Musker and Clements joined Hercules later that same year. Following an unused treatment by Haidar, Clements and Musker studied multiple interpretations of Greek mythology before abandoning Zeus's adulterous affair with Alcmene. The project underwent multiple story treatments and a first script draft was inspired by the screwball comedy films of the classic Hollywood era and popular culture of the 1990s. During production, McEnery, Shaw, and Mecchi were brought on board to revise Musker and Clements' script. British cartoonist Gerald Scarfe was recruited as production designer and produced over seven hundred visualization designs of the characters. Research trips to Greece and Turkey provided inspiration for the background designs. Animation for the film was done in California and Paris. Computer animation was used in several scenes, predominantly in the Hydra battle sequence.

Hercules was released on June 13, 1997, and received generally positive reviews from film critics, with James Woods's performance as Hades receiving particular praise, but the animation (particularly the visual style) and music received a mixed response. The film under-performed in its theatrical release notably in comparison to previous animated Disney films, ultimately earning $252.7 million in box office revenue worldwide. Hercules was later followed by the direct-to-video prequel Hercules: Zero to Hero (1999), which served as the pilot to Hercules: The Animated Series, a syndicated Disney television series focusing on Hercules during his time at the Prometheus Academy.

Plot

In Ancient Greece, the gods Zeus and Hera have a son named Hercules. While the other gods are joyful, Zeus' wicked brother Hades plots to overthrow Zeus and rule Mount Olympus. Through the Fates, Hades learns that in eighteen years, a planetary alignment will allow him to free the Titans to conquer Olympus, but only if Hercules does not interfere. Hades sends his imp minions, Pain and Panic, to murder Hercules, providing them with a potion that can strip a god of immortality. The two kidnap the baby, take him down to the valley and feed him the potion. However, before Hercules drinks the last drop, two farmers pass nearby and startle the demons, causing them to drop the bottle. Hercules is stripped of immortality but retains his god-like strength. Pain and Panic attempt to murder the baby by turning into snakes, but Hercules easily overpowers them. The pair decide not to report their failure to Hades.

Years later, the teenage Hercules becomes an outcast for his inability to control his strength. Wondering about his origins, he decides to visit the Temple of Zeus for answers. Once there, a statue of Zeus comes to life and reveals all to Hercules, telling him that he can earn back his godhood (and return to Olympus, to his family) by becoming a "true hero." Zeus sends Hercules and his forgotten childhood friend Pegasus to the satyr Philoctetes ("Phil") who is known for training heroes. Phil has retired in frustration after none of his past students managed to earn a constellation in the sky. Phil agrees to train Hercules after seeing his strength, and with persuasion from Zeus. After completing the training, Phil and Hercules head towards Thebes. On the way, they meet Megara ("Meg"), a sarcastic damsel with whom Hercules falls in love after saving her from the centaur Nessus. Unbeknownst to Hercules, Meg is Hades' slave and was actually trying to recruit Nessus. She had sold her soul to Hades previously to save a lover who then left her. When Meg mentions what happened, Hades realizes that Pain and Panic failed him and plots to finish off Hercules properly.

Arriving in Thebes, Hercules is met with skepticism by the locals, but then Meg appears, saying that two boys are trapped under a large rock in a gorge. Hercules lifts the rock and rescues the boys, unaware that they are Pain and Panic in disguise, and unwittingly releases the Hydra. Much to Hades's chagrin, Hercules defeats the monster and becomes a celebrated hero. Hercules defeats many other monsters, many of which are sent by Hades, and his popularity and fortune grow. However, Zeus tells him that he is not yet a "true" hero and refuses to explain what that means. Saddened and frustrated, Hercules spends a day out with Meg, and they start falling in love. Hades learns of this, and on the eve of his takeover, he holds Meg hostage and offers her freedom in exchange for Hercules surrendering his powers for a day. On the condition that Meg will be unharmed, Hercules accepts and is heartbroken after learning that Meg was working for Hades all along.

Hades unleashes the Titans, who climb Olympus and defeat the gods, while the Cyclops goes to Thebes to kill Hercules. Hercules uses his wits to defeat the Cyclops. Unfortunately, during the battle, Meg is mortally injured (while saving Hercules from a falling building). This breaks Hades's promise that Meg would not be harmed, so Hercules regains his strength. Hercules and Pegasus fly to Olympus, free the gods and vanquish the Titans, but Meg dies before he can return to her.

To recover Meg's soul, Hercules goes to the underworld and risks his life by leaping into the River Styx. Thanks to his heroic act, Hercules's godhood/immortality is restored while in the river, and he is able to reach Meg's soul and save her. Hercules knocks Hades into the river, where he is trapped by other spirits. After reviving Meg, she and Hercules are summoned to Olympus, where Zeus and Hera welcome their son home, saying that he has proved himself a "true hero" through the "strength of his heart." However, rather than join the gods there, Hercules chooses to forgo his godhood and remain on Earth with Meg. The heroes then return to Thebes, where they watch Zeus form a constellation in Hercules' honor.

Voice cast

 Tate Donovan as Hercules, based on the mythological deity Heracles. Supervising animator Andreas Deja described Hercules as "...not a smart aleck, not streetwise, he's just a naive kid trapped in a big body", and that Donovan "had a charming yet innocent quality in his readings". Donovan had not done any voice-over work prior to Hercules. Deja integrated Donovan's "charming yet innocent quality" into Hercules' expressions.
 Josh Keaton provided the speaking voice of Hercules as a teenager, while Roger Bart provided his singing voice. Originally, Keaton also provided his singing voice, but his singing was re-recorded by Bart. Randy Haycock served as the supervising animator for Hercules as an infant and teenager.
 Danny DeVito as Philoctetes/Phil. Eric Goldberg, the supervising animator for Philoctetes, cited Grumpy in Snow White and Bacchus in Fantasia as the inspirations for the character's design. Goldberg mentioned that they discovered that Danny DeVito "has really different mouth shapes" when they videotaped his recordings and that they used these shapes in animating Phil.
 James Woods as Hades. Producer Alice Dewey mentioned that Hades "was supposed to talk in a slow and be menacing in a quiet, spooky way", but thought that Woods' manner of speaking "a mile a minute" would be a "great take" for a villain. Woods did a lot of ad-libbing in his recordings, especially in Hades' dialogues with Megara. Nik Ranieri, the supervising animator for Hades, mentioned that the character was "based on a Hollywood agent, a car salesman type", and that a lot came from Woods' ad-libbed dialogue. He went on to say that the hardest part in animating Hades was that he talks too much and too fast, so much so that "it took [him] two weeks to animate a one-second scene". Ranieri watched Woods' other films and used what he saw as the basis for Hades' sneer. 
 Susan Egan as Megara. Supervising animator Ken Duncan stated that she was "based on a '40s screwball comedienne" and that he used Greek shapes for her hair ("Her head is in sort of a vase shape and she's got a Greek curl in the back.").
 Rip Torn and Samantha Eggar as Zeus and Hera, Hercules' birth-parents. Anthony DeRosa served as the supervising animator for both characters. In the Swedish dub Max von Sydow provided the voice for Zeus.
 Lillias White, Cheryl Freeman, LaChanze, Roz Ryan and Vaneese Thomas as the Muses (Calliope, Melpomene, Terpsichore, Thalia and Clio respectively), the narrators of the film's story. Michael Show served as the supervising animator for the Muses.
 Bobcat Goldthwait and Matt Frewer as Pain and Panic, Hades' henchmen. James Lopez and Brian Ferguson respectively served as the supervising animators for Pain and Panic.
 Patrick Pinney as the Cyclops. Dominique Monfrey served as the supervising animator for the Cyclops.
 Hal Holbrook and Barbara Barrie as Amphitryon and Alcmene, Hercules' adoptive parents. Richard Bazley served as the supervising animator for both characters.
 Amanda Plummer, Carole Shelley and Paddi Edwards as Clotho, Lachesis, Atropos, the three Fates who predict Hades' failed attempt to conquer Olympus. Nancy Beiman served as the supervising animator for the three characters.
 Paul Shaffer as Hermes. Michael Swofford served as the animator for Hermes.
 Jim Cummings as Nessus. Chris Bailey served as the animator for Nessus. Cummings also voiced the Tall Theban and the Elderly Theban. 
 Wayne Knight as Demetrius
Mary Kay Bergman as the Earthquake Lady
Corey Burton as the Burnt Man
 Kathleen Freeman as the Heavyset Woman
 Keith David as Apollo
 Charlton Heston has a cameo role as the opening narrator.
 Frank Welker as Pegasus. Ellen Woodbury served as the supervising animator for Pegasus.

Production

Development
In early 1992, thirty artists, writers, and animators pitched their ideas for potential animated features, each given a limited time of two minutes. The first pitch was for an adaptation of The Odyssey, which entered into production in the following summer. However, production on the film was abandoned when it was deemed too long, lacked central characters, and failed to translate into animation comedy. Animator Joe Haidar also suggested pitching a story from Greek mythology, but thought his chances plummeted when work on The Odyssey was discontinued. Nervously, he produced a pitch sketch of Hercules, and delivered a brief outline set during the Trojan War where both sides seek the title character for their secret weapon. Hercules makes a choice, without considering the consequences, though in the end, he learns humility and realizes that strength is not always the answer. With the pitching session concluded, Hercules was approved for development in which Haidar presented a page-and-a-half outline, but his involvement with the project succeeded no further.

In November 1992, fresh off of their critical and commercial success of Aladdin (1992), directors Ron Clements and John Musker re-developed Treasure Planet up until fall 1993. Aladdin co-screenwriters Ted Elliott and Terry Rossio subsequently had taken Clements and Musker's earlier ideas and wrote a treatment. Jeffrey Katzenberg, who was the chairman of Walt Disney Studios, disapproved of the project, and instead offered them to do an adaptation of A Princess of Mars (in which Disney had held the film rights to). Clements and Musker were disinterested in the adaptation, and the film rights lapsed shortly after. Katzenberg later struck a deal with the directors to produce another commercially viable film before he would green-light Treasure Planet. Turning down adaptation proposals for Don Quixote, The Odyssey, and Around the World in Eighty Days, the directors were notified of Haidar's pitch for a Hercules feature. "We thought it would be our opportunity to do a "superhero" movie," Musker said, so "Ron and I being comic book fans. The studio liked us moving onto that project and so we did [Hercules]."

Writing
With Hercules in production, Clements and Musker conducted research and wrote extensive notes for the film. On excerpts detailed in November 1993, the similarities between their outlines included the naïve title character caught between two worlds, a Danny DeVito-type sidekick, a world-wise heroine, and a powerful villain in a battle of idealism versus cynicism. The directors also sought inspiration from classic screwball comedy films directed by Preston Sturges and Frank Capra with "Hercules as the young Jimmy Stewart in Mr. Smith Goes to Washington," Musker explained, and "Meg is modeled on Barbara Stanwyck, especially the characters she played in The Lady Eve and Meet John Doe."

While preparing the script, Clements and Musker consulted the works of Thomas Bullfinch, Edith Hamilton, Robert Graves, and other interpreters of Greek mythology until they reached the conclusion to not portray the traditional story of Hercules. Because Zeus sired Hercules outside of his marriage with Hera, Clements remarked "that illegitimacy would be difficult subject matter for a Disney movie. So [he and Musker] thought of different ways he could be half-man and half-god. [They] moved more toward making Hades the villain instead of Hera. The Underworld seemed like such a fascinating, dark image; the contrast with Olympus seemed to have all kinds of visual possibilities." Additionally during their research, the directors were inspired by the correlation of the popularity of Hercules in comparison to that of sport athletes and celebrities in the contemporary era, with both stating Hercules was the Michael Jordan of his era.

After multiple meetings and story conferences, Clements and Musker wrote several story treatments before proceeding to their first script draft. Comedy writers Donald McEnery and Bob Shaw were recruited by creative executive Jane Healey to work on Hercules. Meanwhile, their draft was concurrently rewritten by Irene Mecchi, which altogether brought additional humor and definition to the script.

Casting
Donny Osmond originally auditioned as the speaking voice of the title character, but he was turned down because his voice was considered too deep and would later be given a singing role in Mulan (1998) instead. Writing the role of Philoctetes, Musker and Clements envisioned Danny DeVito in the role. However, DeVito declined to audition so Ed Asner, Ernest Borgnine, and Dick Latessa were brought in to read for the part. After Red Buttons had auditioned, he left stating, "I know what you're gonna do. You're gonna give this part to Danny Devito!" Shortly after, the directors and producer Alice Dewey approached DeVito at a pasta lunch during the filming of Matilda (1996), where DeVito signed on to the role.

For every Disney animated feature since Beauty and the Beast (1991), Susan Egan auditioned for a role, and then landed the role of Belle in the Broadway production. Upon learning about Hercules, Egan actively pursued the role of Megara, though she revealed that "Alan Menken initially blocked me from going after that part. He said that the female lead in Hercules was supposed to be this cynical smart-ass, sounding nothing at all like sweet, innocent Belle." Menken eventually relented and allowed Egan to audition for the role. Egan read for the part in front of a microphone while being videotaped as Menken, Beauty and the Beast musical director Michael Kosarin, and the filmmakers sat at a table with their eyes closed. Nine months following the results of the test animation synced with Egan's audition, Egan won the role. During production, Meg was originally given a ballad titled "I Can't Believe My Heart", but Ken Duncan, the supervising animator of Meg, pointed out the song was out of character for Meg. Menken and Zippel would later compose "I Won't Say I'm in Love" instead.

The casting of Hades proved to be very problematic for Musker and Clements. When DeVito asked the directors who they had in mind to play Hades, Musker and Clements responded by saying they had not selected an appropriate actor. In response, DeVito blurted, "Why don't you ask Jack [Nicholson]?" After DeVito notified Nicholson of the project, the next week, the studio was willing to pay Nicholson $500,000 for the role, but Nicholson demanded roughly a paycheck of $10–15 million, plus a 50 percent cut of all the proceeds from Hades merchandise. Unwilling to share merchandising proceeds with the actor, Disney came back with a counter offer that was significantly less than what Nicholson had asked for. Because of this, Nicholson decided to pass on the project.

Disappointed by Nicholson's refusal, Clements and Musker eventually selected John Lithgow as Hades in fall 1994. After nine months of trying to make Lithgow's portrayal of Hades work, Lithgow was released from the role in August 1995. According to John Musker, Ron Silver, James Coburn, Kevin Spacey, Phil Hartman, and Rod Steiger arrived to the Disney studios to read as Hades. Musker also invited producer Robert Evans to read. Additionally, animator Nik Ranieri claimed Michael Ironside, Terrence Mann, and Martin Landau also auditioned for the role, and that Musker and Clements had reached out to Jerry Lewis to read for the role. When the directors invited James Woods to read for the part, they were surprised by Woods' interpretation, and he was hired by October 1995. Hades's co-henchman Pain was written with Bobcat Goldthwait in mind, although the actor confessed he still had to audition for the role despite playing himself.

Animation and design
In 1993, Clements and Musker fondly remembered a Time magazine cover of the Beatles, illustrated by English cartoonist Gerald Scarfe. While working as the production designer on a production of The Magic Flute, Scarfe was invited to tour the Disney studios where Clements and Musker noticed a direct correlation between Scarfe's style and the Greek vase painting style. With the permission from the Disney studios, Scarfe was hired as production designer to produce a dozen drawings. Scarfe conducted minimal research, not wanting to be influenced by other interpretations where he sent thirty-two sketches via fax machine or courier, and ended up producing more than 700 drawings throughout production. By July 1995, Scarfe and fifteen animators and designers began developing working prototypes for every character in the movie. That same year, the filmmakers embarked on a research trip to Greece and Turkey to research classic Greek mythology. Since Scarfe's style proved to be too fluid and chaotic for the animators, production stylist Sue Nichols created reference charts for the animators on which elements of Scarfe's style, as well as classical Greek illustration, to adapt into their work.

Animation began in early 1995 with a team of nearly 700 artists, animators, and technicians in Burbank, California while Walt Disney Animation France contributed nearly ten minutes of animation, including the finale with the Titans and Hercules' descent into the Underworld. Andreas Deja, the supervising animator for Hercules, commented that the animation crew he worked with to animate Hercules was the "largest [he] ever worked with". He previously worked on other characters (like Gaston in Beauty and the Beast, Jafar in Aladdin, and Scar in The Lion King) with about four animators on his crew, but he had a team of twelve or thirteen for Hercules. Given Deja had worked with three villains before, he was first offered Hades, but asked to animate Hercules instead – "I knew if would be more difficult and more challenging, but I just needed that experience to have that in your repertoire."

Following the release of Pocahontas (1995), Eric Goldberg was initially assigned to animate Hades when Jack Nicholson was thought to play the character. However, when Nicholson decided to pass on the role, Goldberg was not interested in animating the character anymore. Around the same time, Chris Buck was assigned to animate Philoctetes, but after he left the production of Hercules, this left the character of Philoctetes without a supervising animator. Goldberg then decided to instead animate Philoctetes when DeVito signed onto the role noting his similarities with the actor in their short stature, baldness, and admittedly a little "soft around the middle". Throughout production, there were twenty-seven designs for the character, but the final design took inspiration from Grumpy in Snow White and the Seven Dwarfs (1937) and Bacchus in Fantasia (1940) in terms of their curmudgeonly personality and facial structure. For Hades, animator Nik Ranieri took inspiration from Scarfe's concept drawings and James Woods' mannerisms during the recording sessions. While Hades' body was drawn by hand, the animation of the hair was handled by the effects animators with input from Ranieri as to how it should move.

For the Hydra, Scarfe provided preliminary drawings to give the mythical beast its requisite fangs and serpentine necks before work was transferred over to the computer animation team headed by Roger Gould. The Hydra was sculpted into a clay model where the dimensions were digitized into the computers as a wire-frame model by which the monster was animated. Early into production, the filmmakers decided the Hydra would ultimately have thirty heads by which the animators created one master head, and the computer could multiply the heads to their desired scale. Overall, thirteen animators and technical directors spent nearly a year-and-a-half creating the four-minute battle sequence. Additionally, because the directors envisioned Olympus as a city composed of clouds, painted backgrounds of clouds and cloud-like imagery were blended with drawn effects animation to create a morphing technique that were used for baby Hercules's cradle and Zeus's reclining chair.

Music

The soundtrack for Hercules consists of music written by composer Alan Menken and lyricist David Zippel, orchestrated by Daniel Troob and Michael Starobin, with vocals performed by Lillias White, LaChanze, Roz Ryan, Roger Bart, Danny DeVito, and Susan Egan among others. The album also includes the single version of "Go the Distance" by Michael Bolton. This was the last Disney Renaissance film for which Alan Menken composed music.

Release

Marketing
On February 4, 1997, Disney began its marketing campaign by starting a five-month promotional traveling tour called Disney's Hercules Mega Mall Tour. Sponsored by Chevy Venture, the tour traveled throughout 20 cities starting first in Atlanta, Georgia. Previously used for the marketing campaigns for Pocahontas and The Hunchback of Notre Dame, the tour featured eleven attractions including a multimedia stage show, a miniature carousel themed to Baby Pegasus, a carnival with Hercules-themed game booths, and a ten-minute animation workshop hosted by animator Andreas Deja where visitors would try their hand at drawing Hercules.

On June 14, the premiere of the film was accompanied with a Hercules-led performance of Disneyland's Main Street Electrical Parade held in Times Square. The parade of electrified floats, which was broadcast live on the Disney Channel as part of a program involving the making of Hercules, traveled from 42nd Street to Fifth Avenue. The parade also included attendees such as Lauren Hutton, Harvey Keitel, Andy Garcia, Barbara Walters, Michael Bolton, and Marilu Henner, as well as Olympic athletes who rode on thirty floats. The media event was not without controversy as former New York mayor Ed Koch objected to surrendering the city over to Disney, and critics raising questions about what politicians are willing to give a private firm in return for investment. Also, nearly 100 members of National Association of Broadcast Employees and Technicians used the occasion to strike for a new contract from Disney/ABC, with local union president Tony Capitano who complained: "I think the Mayor gave away the city to Disneyland." Furthermore, 5,000 businesses and residents within the city felt unusually eerie upon being asked to dim their lights as the parade passed. Following the parade, a private party was held at the Chelsea Piers complex, where dinner guests were served to a performance of Susan Egan singing songs from the movie along the Hudson River, and ten minutes of fireworks display.

Additionally, the film was accompanied by a marketing campaign with promotional tie-ins with 85 licensees including McDonald's, Mattel, Nestlé, Hallmark, and various merchandise. A tie-in video game, titled Hercules Action Game, was developed by Eurocom and released in July 1997 for the PC and PlayStation. Another tie-in game was developed by Tiertex Design Studios and was released for the Game Boy by THQ the same month. Hercules was also the first Disney on Ice adaptation before the film was theatrically released.

Home media
Hercules was first released on VHS and widescreen LaserDisc in the United States on February 3, 1998, included as an installment of the Walt Disney Masterpiece Collection series. By summer 1998, sales and rentals of the VHS release had accumulated to $165 million. Released on November 9, 1999, Hercules was released in a "Limited Issue" DVD for a limited sixty-day time period before going into moratorium. Launching in January 2000, Walt Disney Home Video began the Gold Classic Collection, with Hercules re-issued on VHS and DVD on August 1, 2000. The DVD contained the film in its 1.66:1 aspect ratio and THX-certified, and was accompanied with special features including "The Making of Hercules" documentary video and the "Go The Distance" music video sung by Ricky Martin, as well as an "Animals of the Outback" activity booklet. The early DVD issues utilized a 35mm print of the film, rather than use the computer to encode the movie directly to digital. The film was released on a Special Edition Blu-ray, DVD, and Digital HD on June 10, 2014. On September 1, 2017, Hercules became available on Netflix.

Reception

Box office
Wall Street analysts estimated that Hercules could bring in between $125 to $150 million in the United States, on the basis of the extensive marketing campaign and the movie's light, humorous tone similar to that of Aladdin. Hercules began its limited release in North America on June 13, 1997, playing in one selected theater. The film earned $249,567 in box office receipts during the weekend of June 13–15, standing at the thirteenth place in the box office ranking. During its first two weeks, the film had grossed $1.45 million when it expanded into two selected theaters. The general release followed on June 27, 1997, in 2,621 screens. During the weekend of June 27–29, box office analysts estimated that Hercules earned $21.5 million ranking second behind Face/Off, which grossed $22.7 million.

In its first two weeks of general release, Hercules amounted $58 million in box office grosses, compared to Pocahontas (which took in $80 million) and The Lion King (which grossed $119 million) in their respective two weeks. Considered a disappointment among Disney shareholders, Disney's stock price slipped 9.7 percent by which executives blamed the film's box office performance on "more competition". By its third weekend, Buena Vista Pictures Distribution president Dick Cook confessed that competing family films such as Men in Black and Batman & Robin played a role in the downward box office performance, but projected the film would receive a worldwide gross of $300 million. Likewise, entertainment analysts speculated Hercules did not appeal strongly towards adults and teenagers compared to Beauty and the Beast, Aladdin, and The Lion King, which served as date movies and family outings. By spring 1998, Hercules grossed $99 million, and the international totals for Hercules raised its gross to $253 million.

Critical response
The website's critical consensus reads, "Fast-paced and packed with dozens of pop culture references, Hercules might not measure up with the true classics of the Disney pantheon, but it's still plenty of fun." Audiences polled by CinemaScore gave the film an average grade of "A" on an A+ to F scale.

James Woods received universal acclaim from film reviewers for his vocal performance as Hades. Reviewing for Entertainment Weekly, Owen Gleiberman graded the film an A− acclaiming it was Woods' most exciting performance since Salvador. He wrote his performance "is an inspired piece of deadpan vaudeville. His dry jocularity is hilariously incongruous – he's like a hostile, wisecracking salesman trapped in the body of the Antichrist." Roger Ebert of the Chicago Sun-Times wrote a positive review of the film, enjoying the story as well as the animation. Ebert also praised Woods' portrayal of Hades, stating that Woods brings "something of the same verbal inventiveness that Robin Williams brought to Aladdin". Similarly, Chicago Tribune film reviewer Gene Siskel, while awarding the film 2 out of 4 stars, stated, "The only memorable character in the film is the nicely drawn villain Hades (voice by James Woods), who seeks to turn Hercules to the dark side. Hades supplies the genie-like patter that Robin Williams provided in Aladdin." Janet Maslin of The New York Times also praised Woods' performance, remarking that he "shows off the full verve of an edgy Scarfe villain", and added "On any level, earthly or otherwise, the ingenious new animated Hercules is pretty divine." James Berardinelli, film critic for ReelViews, awarded the film 3 out of 4, stars writing, "The real star of the show is James Woods, whose Hades is the most vibrant Disney creation since Robin Williams' Genie. Hades is a lively villain with a great repertoire of one-liners. And, although Woods isn't as much of a vocal chameleon as Williams, he's close enough that it hardly matters."

The Scarfe-inspired animation style received mixed reviews, with Berardinelli labeling it as the film's most disappointing aspect. He wrote: "This approach makes the film look rushed and, at times, incomplete. It is never a visual marvel – even the computer-generated scenes fail to impress. The sequences intended to offer the biggest spectacle – Olympus and the Underworld – provoke little more than a yawn." Likewise, Siskel noted his surprise of "how soft and cheap the animation looks." Writing for The Washington Post, Desson Howe criticized the animation as being "some of the worst I've ever cringed through, including the corner-cutting junk of Don Bluth movies and every trashy cartoon that passes for entertainment on Saturday morning television. In Hercules, ancient Thebes looks like a hastily sketched field-trip location from public TV's The Magic School Bus; and no self-respecting immortal would be seen dead in this simplistic rendition of Mount Olympus. Nevertheless, Kenneth Turan of the Los Angeles Times noted the animation "has just enough of a different look to it to make things interesting" and praised the Hydra as a technological marvel.

Likewise, the music also received a mixed response, with Rita Kempley of The Washington Post writing, "Like the other songs by Disney veteran Alan Menken and his new lyricist, David Zippel (City of Angels), the number gets the job done, but it doesn't topple the temple. The score is influenced by gospel, Broadway musicals, processional music and R&B, but its only spice is its variety." Variety film critic Leonard Klady noted the lack of distinctiveness of the music writing Menken "is hitting too many tired notes in his sixth animated score" and "there's simply not a song in the piece that has you humming as you exit the theater, and ballads such as "Go the Distance" will require aggressive repetition to register as playlist material."

Controversy
Disney intended for the film to have an open-air premiere at Pnyx hill, but the Greek government declined after the Greek media and public panned the film. Greek newspaper Adesmevtos Typos called it "another case of foreigners distorting our history and culture just to suit their commercial interests".

Accolades

Legacy

Cancelled sequel
The sequel Hercules II: The Trojan War was planned. It would have been about Hercules is now living in Athens with Megara and their daughter, Hebe. However, when an old friend named Helen is captured by the evil Paris of Troy, Hercules joins the united Greek army as they head out to war. However, this war will create revelations, and Hercules finds an old friend who eventually goes missing. The project was cancelled when John Lasseter was named Disney's new chief creative officer in 2006, in which he called off all direct-to-video sequels that Disney had planned.

Follow-up and TV series
Hercules: Zero to Hero is a 1999 American animated fantasy television film produced by Walt Disney Television Animation. The film is a direct-to-video follow-up to 1997 original animated feature film. It was released on August 17, 1999. The film serves as a package film combining three episodes of the TV series as flashback segments. Hercules: The Animated Series is an American animated television series based on the original film and the Greek myth. The series premiered in syndication on August 31, 1998, and on ABC through its Disney's One Saturday Morning block on September 12, 1998. The syndicated run lasted 52 episodes, while the ABC run lasted 13 episodes.

Stage adaptation

On February 6, 2019, it was announced that a theatrical adaptation of the film would premiere at the Delacorte Theater in Central Park as part of its annual Shakespeare in the Park festival from August 31 until September 8. Menken and Zippel returned to compose and write the songs, while Kristoffer Diaz wrote the book, Lear deBessonet directed and Chase Brock will choreograph. The cast included Jelani Alladin (Hercules), Roger Bart (Hades), Jeff Hiller (Panic), James Monroe Iglehart (Phil), Ramona Keller (Thalia), Tamika Lawrence (Calliope), Krysta Rodriguez (Meg), and Rema Webb (Terpsichore). A revised version of the musical played the Paper Mill Playhouse in Millburn, New Jersey during the 2022-23 season, from February 9 to March 12, 2023. The revised book was written by Kwame Kwei-Armah and Robert Horn.

Live-action remake
On April 29, 2020, it was reported that a live-action remake of Hercules is being developed by Walt Disney Pictures, with Jeffery Silver and Karen Gilchrist, who previously produced the CGI remake of The Lion King, set to produce the film. Joe and Anthony Russo will also serve as producers on the film through their AGBO banner, while Dave Callaham will write the script. On May 7, 2020, the Russo brothers stated that the remake will not be a "literal translation" as they want the film to have new elements yet still being "something that's in the vein of the original and inspired by it". In June 2022, it was announced that Guy Ritchie, who had previously directed Disney's live-action Aladdin remake, had signed on to direct the film. Joe Russo told GamesRadar that the reimagining movie will pay homage to the original with a more modern spin on it and revealed that it will also be a modern musical inspired by TikTok.

See also
 Muses in popular culture

Notes

References

Bibliography

External links

 
 
 
 
 
 

Hercules (franchise)
1997 action comedy films
1997 animated films
1997 films
1990s American animated films
1990s children's animated films
1990s fantasy adventure films
1990s fantasy comedy films
1990s musical comedy films
1990s English-language films
American action comedy films
American children's animated action films
American children's animated adventure films
American children's animated comedy films
American children's animated fantasy films
American children's animated musical films
American fantasy adventure films
American fantasy comedy films
American musical comedy films
American musical fantasy films
American animated feature films
Animated films based on classical mythology
Animated superhero films
Annie Award winners
Fiction about deicide
Demons in film
Disney Renaissance
Films about father–son relationships
Films about Heracles
Films adapted into comics
Films adapted into television shows
Films directed by John Musker
Films directed by Ron Clements
Films produced by John Musker
Films produced by Ron Clements
Films scored by Alan Menken
Films set in ancient Greece
Films with screenplays by John Musker
Films with screenplays by Irene Mecchi
Films with screenplays by Ron Clements
Greek underworld in popular culture
Pegasus in popular culture
American superhero films
Sword and sorcery films
Walt Disney Animation Studios films
Walt Disney Pictures animated films
Films set in Greece